Odoardo is a given name. Notable people with the name include:

Odoardo Barri (1844–1920), the pseudonym of Edward Slater
Odoardo Beccari (1843–1920), Italian naturalist, discovered the titan arum in Sumatra in 1878
Odoardo Borrani (1833–1905), Italian painter associated with the Macchiaioli group
Juan Manuel Cajigal y Odoardo (1803–1856), Venezuelan mathematician, engineer and statesman
Odoardo Farnese (cardinal) (1573–1626), Italian nobleman, son of Alessandro Farnese, Duke of Parma and Maria of Portugal
Alessandro di Odoardo Farnese, Prince of Parma (1635–1689), Italian military leader, Governor of the Habsburg Netherlands from 1678 to 1682
Odoardo Farnese, Duke of Parma (1612–1646), also known as Odoardo I Farnese, Duke of Parma, Piacenza and Castro from 1622 to 1646
Odoardo Farnese, Hereditary Prince of Parma (1666–1693), the son and heir of Duke Ranuccio II Farnese, Duke of Parma and Piacenza
Odoardo Fialetti (1573–1638), Italian painter and printmaker who began his training during the late Renaissance
Odoardo Fischetti (1780–1823), Italian painter of landscapes and history paintings in a Neoclassical style
Odoardo Focherini or Edward Focherini (1907–1944), Italian who issued false documents to Jewish people to escape the Nazi regime
Odoardo Gualandi (died 1598), Bishop of Cesena and writer of De civili facultate
Odoardo Perini (1671–1757), Italian painter of the late-Baroque period, active in Verona
Odoardo Di Santo (born 1934), politician and administrator in Ontario, Canada
Odoardo Spadaro (1893–1965), Italian singer-songwriter and actor
Odoardo Tabacchi (1836–1905), Italian sculptor
Odoardo Toscani (1859–1914), Italian painter, mainly of portraits, battle scenes and genre scenes
Odoardo Vicinelli (1684–1755), Italian painter of the late-Baroque period

See also
Edward

it:Odoardo